William Edward "Eddie" Kirkland Jr. (born December 16, 1981) is an American Christian musician and pastor of The Parish Anglican Church, who primarily plays a contemporary Christian style of worship music. He has released one studio album, Kings & Queens in 2012, with North Point Music.

Early life
William Edward Kirkland Jr., was born on December 16, 1981, in Tarrant, Texas, the son of a pastor, Dr. William Edward Kirkland Sr. and mother, Donna Anne Kirkland (née, Breslend). He has two younger brothers, Christopher and Kyle. Kirkland was raised in Jacksonville, Florida before relocating to Atlanta, Georgia to become the worship pastor at North Point Community Church, where he was based for five years. He is currently the founder and pastor of The Parish Anglican Church in Atlanta, Georgia.

Music career
His music recording career began in 2008, with the album Orthadoxy. The extended play, Here + Now album, was released on October 14, 2011, with North Point Music. The subsequent release, a studio album, Kings & Queens, was released on August 14, 2012, from North Point Music.

Discography
Studio albums
 Kings & Queens (August 14, 2012, North Point)
EPs
 Here + Now (October 14, 2011, North Point)

References

External links
 Official website
 Official website

1981 births
Living people
American performers of Christian music
Musicians from Dallas
Musicians from Jacksonville, Florida
Musicians from Atlanta
Songwriters from Texas
Songwriters from Florida
Songwriters from New York (state)
Songwriters from Georgia (U.S. state)